My Cherie Amour may refer to:

 My Cherie Amour (album), a 1969 album by Stevie Wonder
 "My Cherie Amour" (song), a 1969 song by Stevie Wonder